Mincho Nikolov (Bulgarian: Минчо Николов; born 14 September 1952) is a Bulgarian former rower who competed in the 1976 Summer Olympics and in the 1980 Summer Olympics.

References

1952 births
Living people
Bulgarian male rowers
Olympic rowers of Bulgaria
Rowers at the 1976 Summer Olympics
Rowers at the 1980 Summer Olympics
Olympic bronze medalists for Bulgaria
Olympic medalists in rowing
Medalists at the 1980 Summer Olympics